Kimmeria is a community in the municipality Xanthi in the Xanthi regional unit of Greece. It is located 740 kilometers from Athens, 233 kilometers from Thessalonica, and 5 kilometers east of Xanthi. In 1981, the population of Kimmeria was around 3,588 inhabitants. In 1991, the population declined to around 2,627 inhabitants. At the 2011 census the population of the community was 3,898. The community consists of the settlements Kimmeria, Alikochori, Anthiro, Askyra, Gialistero, Eranos, Ketiki, Livadi, Panepistimioupoli (Campus of Democritus University of Thrace), Pelekito, Porta, Prioni and Ydrochori, many of which are deserted.

References

External links
Greek Travel Pages - Kimmeria

Populated places in Xanthi (regional unit)